Club Sport Marítimo C was a Portuguese football club that played in the MFA Divisão de Honra. It was the second reserve team of Marítimo along with Marítimo B and played home games at the Campo da Imaculada Conceição in Funchal, Madeira.

Founded in 2012, the team played in the 4th tier district leagues until 2018 when it was dissolved and replaced with the newly established Marítimo U23 team. The team won the Taça da Madeira in 2018.

Notable former players
 Fábio China

Honours
Taça da Madeira
Winners: 2018
Runners-up: 2017

Supertaça da Madeira
Runners Up: 2017

Season statistics

 Last updated: 10 February 2021
 Division = Division; Pos = Position in League; Pld = Played; W = Won; D = Drawn; L = Lost; GF = Goals for; GA = Goals against; Pts = Points
 R5 = Fifth round R4 = Fourth round; R3 = Third round; R2 = Second round; R1 = First round; PO = Play-off; GS = Group stage; R64 = Round of 64; R32 = Round of 32; R16 = Round of 16; QF = Quarter-finals; SF = Semi-finals; RU = Runners-up; W = Winners

References

External links
Profile on zerozero.pt

C.S. Marítimo
Maritimo
Sport in Madeira
Association football clubs established in 2012
2012 establishments in Portugal
Portuguese reserve football teams